The Brooklyn Intermodal Rail Yard is a 110-acre Union Pacific rail yard in southeast Portland, Oregon, stretching from Powell Boulevard to Bybee Boulevard and operating since the 1860s. Activities of the yard have been limited by adjacent neighborhoods.

The Oregon Rail Heritage Center has a turntable from the rail yard.

References

External links

 Brooklyn Intermodal Rail Yard, Portland, Oregon at Waymarking

Rail yards in the United States
Southeast Portland, Oregon